Echinogurges anoxius is a species of sea snail, a marine gastropod mollusk in the family Eucyclidae.

Description
The height of the shell attains 3.8 mm.

Distribution
This species occurs in the Atlantic Ocean off Georgia and Eastern Florida at depths between 535 m and 805 m.

References

External links
 To Biodiversity Heritage Library (1 publication)
 To Encyclopedia of Life
 To World Register of Marine Species

anoxius
Gastropods described in 1927